Ross Pond State Park is a public recreation area covering  in the town of Killingly, Connecticut. The state park offers hiking, hunting, fishing, and a boat launch. It sits adjacent to Old Furnace State Park and a blue-blazed trail connects the two.

References

External links
 Ross Pond State Park Connecticut Department of Energy and Environmental Protection

State parks of Connecticut
Parks in Windham County, Connecticut
Protected areas established in 1964
1964 establishments in Connecticut
Killingly, Connecticut